Riso may refer to:

Architecture and museums
 Palazzo Riso, a contemporary art museum in Palermo, Italy

Institutions and corporations
 Riso Kagaku Corporation, a Japanese manufacturer of duplicating machines
 Risø National Laboratory, a scientific research organization in Denmark

People
 Don Richard Riso (1946–2012), author of several books on the Enneagram of Personality